The Kintersburg Covered Bridge is a covered bridge spanning Crooked Creek in Rayne Township, Indiana County, Pennsylvania, United States. Built in 1877, it is one of four covered bridges in the county, and is the only one with a Howe truss design. The Howe design is rather rare in covered bridges. The Kintersburg Bridge is one of only five in the state of Pennsylvania with that design. The other four are the McConnell's Mill Covered Bridge in Lawrence County, Mean's Ford Covered Bridge in Bucks County, St. Mary's Covered Bridge in Huntingdon County, and the Thomas Mill Covered Bridge in Philadelphia County.

Because of its Howe design, the bridge was placed on the National Register of Historic Places in 1979.

Notes

Sources
Evans, Benjamin D., and June R. Evans Pennsylvania's Covered Bridges, University of Pittsburgh Press, 2001, .

External links

 National Register of Historic Places, Indiana County
 Indiana County Parks and Trails

Bridges completed in 1877
Covered bridges on the National Register of Historic Places in Pennsylvania
Covered bridges in Indiana County, Pennsylvania
Wooden bridges in Pennsylvania
Bridges in Indiana County, Pennsylvania
Tourist attractions in Indiana County, Pennsylvania
National Register of Historic Places in Indiana County, Pennsylvania
Road bridges on the National Register of Historic Places in Pennsylvania
Howe truss bridges in the United States
1877 establishments in Pennsylvania